Veterinary ethics is a system of moral principles that apply values and judgements to the practice of veterinary medicine. As a scholarly discipline, veterinary ethics encompasses its practical application in clinical settings as well as work on its history, philosophy, theology, and sociology.   Veterinary ethics combines veterinary professional ethics and the subject of animal ethics.  The subject of veterinary ethics can be interpreted as an extension of critical thinking skills necessary to make the decisions in veterinary care in order to support the profession's responsibilities to animal kind and mankind.

History 

Animal welfare as a subject has been studied in great depth. It largely looks at the ways in which an animal may suffer in particular circumstances, or how their lives may be enriched.  Animal ethics is another well-documented subject, and philosophers since Aristotle, have commented on its importance.  Often referred to as “the animal problem,’ the questions that seem to be asked in this field are at their foundation trying to determine what the morally relevant difference is between animals and humans, and if there is no difference how do we justify treating animals a certain way, and if there is a difference then what is it about this difference that allows us to treat animals in a certain way.

Veterinary ethics is a modern subject that does not have a defined start point.  As it combines the study of animal welfare and animal ethics as its root and uses information from this as data for its deliberations it could be said to have a long history, however as an academic discipline it is only recently that works have been published on the topic.

The two academics who have written on veterinary ethics for the longest time are Bernard Rollin (Colorado State University) and Jerrold Tannenbaum (University of California, Davis). More recently, emergency veterinarian Jessica Fragola wrote in 2022 about the ethics of animal triage, with pressures on veterinarians having been exacerbated by staffing shortages that resulted from the Covid pandemic, coupled with growth in spending on veterinary care and on pet insurance. They can be seen as the founders of the subject in veterinary ethics.  Currently, most veterinary schools teach veterinary ethics, and it is often combined in teaching with animal welfare or with law.

Relation with medical ethics 

The subject is very similar to that of human medical ethics, in that the study of the relationship between the doctor and the patient relates closely to that of the veterinary surgeon and animal owner.  However, the subject differs greatly in the consideration of the uses of animals - while a doctor’s duty may to preserve life at nearly all cost, the veterinary surgeon needs to adapt their attitude to health and longevity of life to the purpose of the animal (e.g., farm animals).

Much of what is understood in the field of professionalism and professional responsibilities in confidentiality, preserving autonomy, beneficence, truth-telling, whistleblowing, informed consent and communication is largely lifted from the research done in the medical profession.  The difference between the human patients and the animal patients does not interfere with the professionalism discussion between doctors and human patients and vets with their clients.

Another major difference between veterinary ethics and human medical ethics is the interplay with law.  Human medical ethics has driven changes in the law and, to a lesser degree, vice versa.  Largely involving cases of human rights a wide ranging variety of high-profile legal challenges in many countries have involved the use of ethics to encourage changes in law (for example, assisted suicide, abortion, duty of care, rights to refuse treatment).  Veterinary ethics does not have such a strong interplay.  It is rare to have an animal-based legal challenge reach high into the legal system.   Cases involving challenges to professionalism and duty of care are largely dealt with via the veterinary governing bodies.

The veterinary profession remains largely self-regulating across the world (e.g., by the RCVS in the United Kingdom and AVMA in the United States).  This has caused some controversy as to why the veterinary profession remains one of the few remaining self-regulating professions. Bernard Rollin wrote on the difficulty in keeping public confidence while remaining self-regulating; trust and impartiality are critical, but most important is the need for a profession to be self-sacrificial by putting the client's needs above that of the profession or professional.

“Every profession—be it medicine, law, or agriculture—is given freedom by the social ethic to pursue its aims. In return, society basically says to professions it does not understand well enough to regulate, “You regulate yourselves the way we would regulate you if we understood what you do, which we don’t. But we will know if you don’t self-regulate properly and then we will [hammer you with draconian rules and] regulate you, despite our lack of understanding.”

Principles 
The American Veterinary Medical Association (AVMA) regularly reviews and updates its principles of ethics.  The AVMA Judicial Council ensures the principles are current.  Much like the human medical code, veterinarians are expected to "adhere to a progressive code of ethical conduct". Overall there are eight main principles, covering areas such as competence, animal welfare, the veterinarian-client-patient relationship, standards of professionalism, honesty, compliance with the law, continuing education, acting within boundaries of competence, and the betterment of public health.

Key topics 
Key topics within veterinary ethics include:

 Complementary and alternative medicine
 Confidentiality
 Cosmetic interventions
 Euthanasia
 Informed consent
 Negligence
 Non-therapeutic mutilations
 Professionalism and professional regulation
 Religious influences
 Research ethics
 Selective breeding
 Triage

See also
 Universities Federation for Animal Welfare

References

Animal ethics
Bioethics
Veterinary medicine